Ferriols is a surname. Notable people with the surname include:

 John Ferriols (born 1974), Filipino basketball player
 Mickey Ferriols (born 1973), American-born Filipino actress
 Roque Ferriols (1924–2021), Filipino Jesuit philosopher

See also
Ferriola